Yomp may refer to:
 Yomp, a Royal Marine term for a long-distance march with full kit
 "Yomp", a song by thenewno2 from You Are Here
 Yomp,  a 1983 videogame by Virgin Games, Inc.